The Sturbridge Common Historic District encompasses the historic center of Sturbridge, Massachusetts. The district is roughly linear, extending along Main Street from its junction with Interstate 84 eastward to Hall Road. The district also extends for short distances along Haynes, Maple, and Charlton Streets. Although most of the properties in the district are residential, the institutional properties, including the 1838 Greek Revival Town Hall, the 1896 Joshua Hyde Library building, and the 1922 Federated Church. The oldest building in the district is the c. 1772 Publick House, a tavern which has dominated the south side of the district since its construction.

The district was listed on the National Register of Historic Places in 1977.

See also
National Register of Historic Places listings in Worcester County, Massachusetts

References

Historic districts in Worcester County, Massachusetts
National Register of Historic Places in Worcester County, Massachusetts
Buildings and structures in Sturbridge, Massachusetts
Historic districts on the National Register of Historic Places in Massachusetts